Stilla flexicostata is a species of sea snail, a marine gastropod mollusk in the family Raphitomidae.

Description
The length of the shell attains 2.25 mm, its diameter 1.25 mm.

(Original description) The minute, white, semi-transparent shell has an oval-elongated shape. Its spire is longer than the body whorl. It contains five whorls, narrowly shouldered, with flexuous plicae, about 16 on the body whorl, microscopically spirally striate. The protoconch consists of 1½ smooth, minute whorls. The suture is deep. The aperture is oval and angled above. The outer lip is somewhat thickened, sinuous, with a broad shallow sinus just below the suture. The columella is arcuate, slightly callous. The anterior siphonal canal is  short, rather oblique and truncated. The animal is unknown.

Distribution
This marine species is endemic to New Zealand and occurs off Foveaux Strait, Stewart, Snares and Auckland Island

References

 Powell, A.W.B. 1979 New Zealand Mollusca: Marine, Land and Freshwater Shells, Collins, Auckland
 Spencer, H.G., Marshall, B.A. & Willan, R.C. (2009). Checklist of New Zealand living Mollusca. Pp 196-219. in: Gordon, D.P. (ed.) New Zealand inventory of biodiversity. Volume one. Kingdom Animalia: Radiata, Lophotrochozoa, Deuterostomia. Canterbury University Press, Christchurch.

External links
 
 Spencer H.G., Willan R.C., Marshall B.A. & Murray T.J. (2011). Checklist of the Recent Mollusca Recorded from the New Zealand Exclusive Economic Zone

flexicostata
Gastropods described in 1899
Gastropods of New Zealand